The Don't Believe the Truth World Tour was a concert tour by English rock band Oasis, which took place in 2005 and 2006, in Europe, the US, Canada, Japan, Australia, some parts of Asia, South America and Mexico. The tour was in promotion of their album Don't Believe the Truth and they had booked many large venues and gigs. Their tour started on 10 May 2005 at the London Astoria and ended on 31 March 2006 at the Palacio de los Deportes in Mexico City. The tour would be the group's most successful as it would go on without any major incidents like on the band's prior tours. This would be the group's only tour with Zak Starkey on drums after Alan White was fired by the band in January 2004.

Set list
This set list is representative of the performance on 2 July 2005 in Manchester, England. It does not represent all concerts for the duration of the tour.

"Fuckin' in the Bushes"
"Turn Up the Sun"
"Lyla"
"Bring It On Down"
"Morning Glory"
"Cigarettes & Alcohol"
"The Importance of Being Idle"
"Little by Little"
"A Bell Will Ring"
"Acquiesce"
"Songbird"
"Live Forever"
"Mucky Fingers"
"Wonderwall"
"Champagne Supernova"
"Rock 'n' Roll Star"
Encore:
Guess God Thinks I'm Abel"
"The Meaning of Soul"
"Don't Look Back in Anger"
"My Generation"

Other songs performed:
"Headshrinker"
"Stop Crying Your Heart Out"
"Love Like A Bomb"
"The Masterplan"
"Talk Tonight"
"Supersonic"

Tour dates

Rescheduled dates

Notes

References

Oasis (band) concert tours
2005 concert tours
2006 concert tours